Hub Sports Arena, formerly SuperSports Arena, was a Singaporean television sports channel operated by StarHub, available on StarHub TV. It broadcasts coverage of sporting events such as Lions 12 (M-League) and S-League.

Hub Sports Arena ceased transmission on 28 December 2018.

Coverage
 Lions 12 (M-League)
 S-League
 National School Games 2015 in Singapore
 National School Games 2015 In Malaysia

2012 establishments in Singapore
2018 disestablishments in Singapore
Sports television in Singapore
Television channels and stations established in 2012
Television channels and stations disestablished in 2018